Titanostrombus is a genus of sea snails, marine gastropod mollusks in the family Strombidae, the true conchs.

Species
Species within the genus Titanostrombus include:
Titanostrombus galeatus (Swainson, 1823)
Titanostrombus goliath (Schröter, 1805)

References

Strombidae
Monotypic gastropod genera